Malcolm Smith Schell (November 13, 1855 – December 25, 1926) was a Canadian politician.

Born in County of Oxford, near Woodstock, Canada West, son of Jacob Schell and Catherine Smith. He is Great Grandson of Johann Christian Schell, a Palatine German from German Flatts, New York who died fighting for the Americans in 1782 on his farm. The family moved to Canada after the American Revolution to take advantage of the land available in Ontario. Schell was educated at public schools and Woodstock College. An agriculturist, a lumberman and a produce exporter, he was elected to the House of Commons of Canada for the Ontario electoral district of Oxford South in the federal election of 1904. A Liberal, he was re-elected in 1908 and was defeated in 1911 and 1917.

His brother Jacob Thomas also served in the House of Commons.

References
 The Canadian Parliament; biographical sketches and photo-engravures of the senators and members of the House of Commons of Canada. Being the tenth Parliament, elected November 3, 1904

External links
 

1855 births
1926 deaths
Liberal Party of Canada MPs
Members of the House of Commons of Canada from Ontario
People from Oxford County, Ontario